Andrea Alessi (1425–1505) was an Albanian architect and sculptor born in Durazzo (Albania Veneta), considered one of the most distinguished artists of Dalmatia.

Alessi was born in Durazzo (modern Durrës, Albania) in Albania Veneta, and may have been of local Albanian origin rather than Italian. Other sources say he was of Italian origin. He moved to Split in Dalmatia during the Republic of Venice, where he studied under sculptor Mark Troja. He lived most of his life and conducted much of his work in Dalmatia. Alessi was a disciple of Giorgio da Sebenico, and his best-known work is with Niccolò di Giovanni Fiorentino on the expansion of the chapel of Blessed John of Trogir in 1468.
Just like Šibenik Cathedral of St James in Croatia (then part of Venetian Dalmatia), it was composed out of large stone blocks with extreme precision. It is unique harmony of architecture and sculpture according to antique ideals. From inside, there is no flat wall. In the middle of chapel, on the altar, lays the sarcophagus of blessed John of Trogir. Surrounding are reliefs of puttos carrying torches that look like they were peeping out of doors of Underworld. Above them there are niches with sculptures of Christ and apostles (the principle work of Alessi), amongst them are putties, circular windows encircled with fruit garland, and a relief of Nativity. All is ceiled with coffered ceiling with image of God in the middle and 96 portrait heads of angels. With so many faces of smiling children the chapel looks very cheerful and there isn’t nothing similar in European art of that time.

Andrea is best known for his merchant statues in Ancona, Italy, and his 1454 mural paintings in a church on Arabe island of Dalmatia particularly The Baptistry of Trogir".
He signed the Trogir Baptistery in 1467 with: ANDREAS ALEXIUS DURRACHINUS OPIFEX MCCCCXII'' (Andreas Alexius, artisan from Durrës, 1462).

He died in Split and is buried in D a Church in Split, Croatia in 1505.

References

External links
 Biography at the Croatian Post stamp collection web site

15th-century architects
15th-century sculptors
Republic of Venice architects
Republic of Venice sculptors
Albanian architects
Albanian sculptors
People from Durrës
1425 births
1505 deaths
Venetian period in the history of Albania
Venetian period in the history of Croatia